Monica Vikström-Jokela (born 19 June 1960) is a Finnish-Swedish television script writer and author from Finland.

She lives in Nuuksio, Espoo with her five children. She has written four books about "Ellen Annorlunda" in Swedish, and one fact book "Kyrkoåret runt i skola och hem". The Ellen Annorlunda (translated: Ellen the different one) books have been translated into Finnish and Norwegian. Vikström-Jokela has also written many tales to Kyrkposten in 2004–2005, for example "Kungsorden" and "Dumma kungen"

Bibliography
  Ellen Annorlunda (barnbok). Fontana 2001.
  Ellen Annorlunda: Stjärnroller och magplask (barnbok) Fontana 2002.
  Ellens annorlunda sommar (barnbok). Fontana 2003.
  Ellens annorlunda chat (barnbok). Fontana 2004.
  Kyrkoåret runt i skola och hem (fakta- och andaktsbok, tillsammans med Birgitta Vikström). Församlingsförbundet 1985.

Plays 
 Sofias sommar. Purmo sommarteater 2005.

References

Swedish-language writers
Finnish writers
1960 births
Living people
Finnish women writers
Swedish-speaking Finns
Swedish women writers